KLSQ (870 AM) is a commercial radio station broadcasting a Spanish sports format. Licensed to Whitney, Nevada, United States, it primarily serves the Las Vegas area. The station is owned by Latino Media Network; under a local marketing agreement, it is programmed by previous owner TelevisaUnivision's Uforia Audio Network.

History
KLSQ began as KROL in 1986. KROL was founded by "Laughlin Roughrider Broadcasting" and operated from two tower sites. A three-tower operation was built in Laughlin for a 10,000 watt day and 1,000 watt night operation, using two different, three-tower directional antenna system. The other site was near Henderson and was the KROL experimental synchronous transmitter, using a non-directional antenna by day and a three-tower directional system by night. After 840 AM went on in the area, measurements were made showing that a power increase would not cause prohibited overlap with KROL on 870. This allowed an increase to 5,000 watts days (still at 500 watts nights). Both sites used diesel generators to make all of the power to broadcast.

The station was sold to Million Dollar Broadcasting and changed call letters to KOWA, known as "The Cow".

Heftel Broadcasting bought the station in 1995 and changed to a format of Spanish hits.

Management at HBC were concerned that the bulk of population covered by the station was from the second transmitter in the Las Vegas area. This coverage was licensed as a secondary authorization, and was subject to cancellation with little or no prior notice. David Stewart at HBC Engineering found a way to make the northern signal the main (and only site). The city of license was changed from Laughlin to Whitney (which combined some unincorporated Clark County with the former village of East Las Vegas). The former main site in Laughlin was parted out. The Laughlin towers are used by other area stations, including radio stations KFLG and KZZZ, and, at one time, the analog operation of KMCC.

On December 20, 2016, Univision Radio announced that KLSQ would be one of the charter affiliates of their new Spanish-language sports network, Univision Deportes Radio, which launched in early 2017.

KLSQ went silent in late 2019. Efforts to ascertain the station's status and ultimate disposition have yielded no information. On December 12, 2020, KLSQ resumed broadcasting with a simulcast of KISF. It has since switched back to Spanish sports as TUDN Radio.

On June 3, 2022, Univision announced it would sell a package of 18 radio stations across 10 of its markets, primarily AM outlets in large cities (including KLSQ) and entire clusters in smaller markets such as McAllen, Texas, and Fresno, California, for $60 million to a new company known as Latino Media Network (LMN); Univision proposed to handle operations for a year under agreement before turning over operational control to LMN in the fourth quarter of 2023. The sale was approved by the Federal Communications Commission (FCC) that November, and completed in January 2023.

References

External links

LSQ
LSQ
Univision Radio Network stations
Radio stations established in 1986
1986 establishments in Nevada
Spanish-language radio stations in the United States
Sports radio stations in the United States